The following are the Pulitzer Prizes for 1979.

Journalism awards

Public Service:
The Point Reyes Light, a California weekly. For its investigation of Synanon, (written by Dr. Richard Ofshe).
Local General or Spot News Reporting:
The San Diego Evening Tribune, for its coverage of the collision of a Pacific Southwest air liner with a small plane over its city.
Local Investigative Specialized Reporting:
 Gilbert M. Gaul and Elliot G. Jaspin of the Pottsville Republican (Pennsylvania), for stories on the destruction of the Blue Coal Company by men with ties to organized crime.
National Reporting:
 James Risser of the Des Moines Register, for a series on farming damage to the environment.
International Reporting:
 Richard Ben Cramer of The Philadelphia Inquirer, for reports from the Middle East.
Feature Writing:
 Jon D. Franklin, science writer of The Baltimore Evening Sun, for an account of brain surgery.
Commentary:
 Russell Baker of The New York Times.
Criticism:
 Paul Gapp, architecture critic of the Chicago Tribune.
Editorial Writing:
 Edwin M. Yoder Jr. of the Washington Star.
Editorial Cartooning:
 Herbert Lawrence Block (Herblock) of The Washington Post, for the body of his work.
Spot News Photography:
 Thomas J. Kelly III of the Pottstown Mercury (Pennsylvania), for a series called Tragedy on Sanatoga Road.
Feature Photography:
 Staff Photographers of the Boston Herald American, for photographic coverage of the blizzard of 1978.

Letters, Drama and Music Awards

Fiction:
 The Stories of John Cheever by John Cheever (Alfred A. Knopf)
Drama:
 Buried Child by Sam Shepard (Urizen)
History:
 The Dred Scott Case by Don E. Fehrenbacher (Oxford University Press)
Biography or Autobiography:
 Days of Sorrow and Pain: Leo Baeck and the Berlin Jews by Leonard Baker (Macmillan Publishers (United States))
Poetry:
 Now and Then by Robert Penn Warren (Random House)
General Non-Fiction:
 On Human Nature by Edward O. Wilson (Harvard University Press)
Music:
 Aftertones of Infinity by Joseph Schwantner (C. F. Peters) first performed by the American Composers Orchestra on January 29, 1979, in Alice Tully Hall New York City.

References

External links
 

Pulitzer Prizes by year
Pulitzer Prize
Pulitzer Prize